Goodenia corynocarpa is a species of flowering plant in the family Goodeniaceae and endemic to near-coastal areas in the west of Western Australia. It is a herb with linear to elliptic leaves at the base of the plant, and racemes of yellow flowers.

Description

Taxonomy and naming
Goodenia corynocarpa was first formally described in 1860 by Ferdinand von Mueller in Fragmenta Phytographiae Australiae from material collected near the Murchison River by Augustus Oldfield. The specific epithet (corynocarpa) means "club-fruited".

Distribution and habitat
This goodenia grows on grassy plains in near-coastal areas of Western Australia between Onslow and the Murchison River.

Conservation status
Goddenia corynocarpa is classified as "not threatened" by the Department of Environment and Conservation (Western Australia).

References

corynocarpa
Eudicots of Western Australia
Plants described in 1860
Taxa named by Ferdinand von Mueller